Randhir Singh (r.1805–1823) was the ruler of the Princely state Bharatpur and successor of Ranjit Singh of Bharatpur. Randhir Singh ascended the throne after death of his father Ranjit Singh in 1805.

Randhir Singh tried to improve the state administration in various ways. He abolished the huge army that was creating disturbances and rebels due to delay in payment of salaries in order to maintain peace and reduced taxes in the state. He helped the British rule to reduce the terror of Pindaris. He ruled Bharatpur for 18 years with harmony and vision.

He constructed Chhatri and Palace in memory of his father Ranjit Singh. He had no son. He died in 1823. His successor was his brother Baldeo Singh.

References

Rulers of Bharatpur state
Date of birth missing
1823 deaths
Jat rulers
Jat